Enka Sport Hall is an indoor multi-purpose sport venue that is located in Aliağa, İzmir Province, Turkey. The hall has a seating capacity of 2,500 spectators.

The sport hall was built by Enka Foundation and donated to Aliağa Municipality. Opened in 2003, it is home to wrestling and basketball branches of the Aliağa Youth and Sports Club. The basketball team of the club plays currently in the Turkish Basketball League.

References

Sports venues completed in 2003
Aliağa District
Indoor arenas in Turkey
Basketball venues in Turkey
Turkish Basketball League venues